The 2021–22 season was Wigan Athletic's 90th year in their history and second consecutive season in League One. Along with the league, the club will also compete in the FA Cup, the EFL Cup and the EFL Trophy. The season covered the period from 1 July 2021 to 30 April 2022.

First-team squad

Statistics

Appearances & Goals 

|-
!colspan=14|Players out on loan:

|}

Goals record

Disciplinary record

Transfers

Transfers in

Loans in

Loans out

Transfers out

Pre-season friendlies
Wigan Athletic announced friendlies against Oldham Athletic, AFC Fylde, Bootle, Stoke City and Preston North End as part of their pre-season preparations.

Competitions

Overview

League table

Results summary

Results by matchday

League One 

The league fixtures were revealed on 24 June 2021.

FA Cup

Wigan were drawn at home to Solihull Moors in the first round. away to Colchester United in the second round. at Home to Blackburn Rovers in the third round. and away to Stoke City in the Fourth round.

EFL Cup

The Latics were drawn away to Hull City in the first round Bolton Wanderers at home in the second round and Sunderland again at home in the third round.

EFL Trophy

Wigan were drawn into Northern Group C alongside Crewe Alexandra, Shrewsbury Town and Wolverhampton Wanderers U21s. The group stage fixtures were announced on July 15. In the knock-out stages, they were drawn away to Oldham Athletic in the third round at home to Arsenal U21 in the quarter-final. and at home to Sutton United in the Semi Final.

Notes

References 

Wigan Athletic
Wigan Athletic F.C. seasons